Chrissiesmeer (Lake Chrissie) is a small town situated in Msukaligwa Local Municipality, in a wetland area of Mpumalanga province in South Africa, on the northern banks of the eponymous Lake Chrissie.

History
The San inhabited this area along with the Tlou-tle people who lived on rafts in the larger lakes.

Geography
In total there are more than 270 lakes in the immediate area (located not far from Carolina). Every year nearly 20,000 flamingo come into the area to breed.

References

 Encyclopædia Britannica entry on Lake Chrissie

External links
 Official Site

Populated places in the Msukaligwa Local Municipality
Populated places founded by Afrikaners
Populated places established in 1860